The 1898–99 Football Tournament was the 4th staging of The Football Tournament.

In case of a tie, extra-time would be played, and if the match was still level after it, the match would be replayed until a winner emerged.

Overview
It was contested by 6 teams, and Akademisk Boldklub won the championship for the sixth time in their history.

League standings

References

External links
RSSSF

1898–99 in Danish football
Top level Danish football league seasons
The Football Tournament seasons
Denmark